The Algeria national beach soccer team represents Algeria in international beach soccer competitions and is controlled by the Algerian Football Federation, the governing body for football in Algeria.

Current squad
Correct as of June 2011

Coach: Lakhdar Belloumi

Current Staff
 Assistant Manager: Mourad Slatni
 Head Delegation: Mustapha Kouici

Achievements
CAF Beach Soccer Championship Best: sixth place
2011

External links
Algeria in 2011 CAF Beach Soccer – dzfoot.com

algeria
Beach Soccer